Halutuimmat is a compilation album by Finnish singer-songwriter Aki Sirkesalo. Released by Sony Music Entertainment on 26 September 2002, the album peaked at number nine on the Finnish Albums Chart.

Track listing

Chart performance

References

2002 albums
Aki Sirkesalo albums
Sony Music albums
2002 compilation albums